This is a list of fossiliferous stratigraphic units in Austria.



List of fossiliferous stratigraphic units

See also 
 List of fossiliferous stratigraphic units in Europe
 List of fossiliferous stratigraphic units in Germany
 List of fossiliferous stratigraphic units in Czech Republic
 List of fossiliferous stratigraphic units in Slovakia
 List of fossiliferous stratigraphic units in Hungary
 List of fossiliferous stratigraphic units in Slovenia
 List of fossiliferous stratigraphic units in Italy
 List of fossiliferous stratigraphic units in Switzerland

References 
 

 Austria
Austria geography-related lists